Al este del oeste is a 1984 Spanish comedy western film directed and written by Mariano Ozores, and starring Fernando Esteso, Conrado San Martín, Adriana Vega, Fernando Sancho and África Pratt. It was composed by Gregorio García Segura and Esteso sang in the credits.

Diego García is a stuntman. According to Esteso, it is one of his best films.

Cast

 Fernando Esteso as Bill Pistolas de oro
 Antonio Ozores as Polonio Horacio Platón
 Conrado San Martín as Alcalde, Padre de Margaret
 Adriana Vega as Margaret Rose
 Fernando Sancho as Chapulín
 Africa Pratt as Stella
 José Manuel Martín as Bad Milk
 Luis Barbero as Mr. First
 Adrian Ortega
 Francisco Camoiras as Foster - Barber
 Tito García as Tafford, Blacksmith
 Mayte Sancho
 Pilar Bardem as Martha Tafford
 Víctor Israel as Tumbas - Undertaker
 Emilio Fornet as Sheriff Coward
 Francisco Nieto as Bad Milk Henchman
 Guillermo Anton
 Juanito Navarro as Blackandecker
 Joaquin Pascual
 Jose Luis Ayestaran
 Dolores Gonzalez
 Rafaela Godoy
 Susana Cerro
 Leticia Jimenez
 Maria Fernandez
 Paola Parker
 Analia Ibar as Prostituta
 María Teresa Merino

References

Bibliography

External links
 

1980s sex comedy films
Spanish Western (genre) comedy films
1980s Western (genre) comedy films
Films directed by Mariano Ozores
Films scored by Gregorio García Segura
Films shot in Almería
Films shot in Madrid
1984 comedy films
1984 films
Spanish sex comedy films